Timothy Nga (10 June 19739 January 2023) was a Singaporean actor. Nga began his professional career in 2003 and performed with several local companies, including The Necessary Stage, the Singapore Repertory Theatre (SRT), and Wild Rice.

Acting credits

Theatre

Film

Television

References

External links
 

1973 births
2023 deaths
Singaporean actors